Magdaléna Platzová (born 8 March 1972) is a Czech writer.

She was educated in Washington, D.C. and England; Platzová received a MA in philosophy from Charles University. During her twenties, she was a member of a Franco-Czech theater group. In the late 1990s, she was assistant to Petr Lébl at the Theatre on the Balustrade. From 2009 to 2012, she lived in New York City; she taught a course on Franz Kafka at the Gallatin School of Individualized Study. Since 2012, Platzová lives in Lyon.

In 2003, she published a collection of short stories Sůl, ovce a kamení ("Salt, Sheep and Stone"). Her plays Na útěku ("On the Run") and Sayang were finalists for the Alfréd Radok Awards.

Her work has been translated to English, German, Dutch, Swedish, Croat, Slovenian and French.

Selected work 
 Návrat přítelkyně ("The Return of a Friend"), novella (2004)
 Aaronův skok, novel (2006), translated to English as Aaron’s Leap (2014) 
 Recyklovaný muž ("The Recycled Man"), short stories (2008)
 Toník a jeskyně snů ("Tonik and the Cave of Dreams"), children's book (2010)
 Anarchista ("The Attempt"), novel (2013), translated into English as "The Attempt" (2016)
 "Druhá strana ticha" ("The Other Side of Silence") (2018)
 "Máme holý ruce" ("Our Hands are Bare"),(2019) book on Velvet revolution for young adults

References 

1972 births
Living people
Czech journalists
Czech women journalists
Czech women novelists
Czech women short story writers
Czech short story writers
Czech women dramatists and playwrights
Writers from Prague
Charles University alumni
21st-century Czech novelists
21st-century Czech dramatists and playwrights
21st-century short story writers
21st-century journalists
21st-century Czech women writers